Til Ezer  (also known in Arabic as al-Qaḥṭānīya or Qahtaniyah, also spelled Giruzer, Kar Izir, Kahtaniya) is a village located in the Sinjar District of the Ninawa Governorate in Iraq. The village is located south of the Sinjar Mount, in the disputed territories of Northern Iraq.

Til Ezer is populated by Yazidis. It was one of two villages targeted in the 2007 Yazidi communities bombings against the local Yazidi community.

See also 
Siba Sheikh Khidir
Genocide of Yazidis by ISIL
Sinjar massacre

References

Nineveh Governorate
Yazidi populated places in Iraq